David Murnane (30 August 1893 – 16 May 1925) was an Irish hurler. Usually lining out as a full-back, he was a member of the Limerick team that won the 1921 All-Ireland Championship.

Honours

Limerick
All-Ireland Senior Hurling Championship (1): 1921
Munster Senior Hurling Championship (2): 1921, 1923

References

1893 births
1925 deaths
Fedamore hurlers
Limerick inter-county hurlers
Hurling backs
All-Ireland Senior Hurling Championship winners